Sanawad railway station is a small railway station in Khargone district, Madhya Pradesh. Its code is SWD. It serves Sanawad town. The station consists of two platforms, neither well sheltered. It lacks many facilities including water and sanitation. The station is situated on the  Akola–Ratlam line, which is under gauge conversion. Gauge conversion between Choral to Mhow is not possible due to tricky ghat section of Vindhyachal ranges.

Major trains 

Some of the important trains that runs from Sanawad are:

 52963/52964 Mhow–Sanawad Passenger
 52975/52976 Mhow–Sanawad Passenger
 52973/52974 Mhow–Sanawad Passenger
 52973/52974 Mhow–Sanawad Passenger

Connectivity
The station is connected with Dr. Ambedkar Nagar Railway Station (MHOW) to the north west and Khandwa Junction railway station to the south-east.

The station is well-connected to Indore Jn. via Dr. Ambedkar Nagar, MHOW.

Electrification
At present, the station is on non-electrified rail route.

Developments
The conversion of Dr. Ambedkar Nagar Railway Station (MHOW) to Sanawad (meter-gauge) to (broad-gauge) rail line is in progress. Upon completion, It would directly connect Indore to Mumbai.

References

Railway stations in Khandwa district
Ratlam railway division